Carey Hall Cash is a United States Navy rear admiral and chaplain who serves as the 21st Chaplain of the United States Marine Corps and Deputy Chief of Chaplains of the United States Navy since May 2022.

Early life, family and education
Cash was born in Memphis, Tennessee to a deeply religious family. His father, Roy Cash, Jr., was a fighter pilot in the Navy for 30 years.  His mother, Billie, runs a Christian ministry and is the author of several books about her faith. His older sister, Kellye Cash, was Miss America 1987.

At six feet four inches tall and a graduate of The Citadel in South Carolina and of Southwestern Baptist Theological Seminary, Rev. Cash nearly became a professional football player.  He is the great-nephew of the singer Johnny Cash.

Military career
Lt. Cash served on the battlefield during the 2003 invasion of Iraq.  As a fervent believer, he was deeply committed to spreading Christianity within the armed forces and believed a "wall of angels" protected his men as they fought their way from Kuwait to Baghdad.  He baptized more than fifty men during the war.

Chaplain Cash served at Camp David, the U.S. presidential retreat, and found himself ministering to President Barack Obama; in this sense, Rev. Cash could be considered Mr. Obama's pastor. In addition, he served as Senior Protestant Chaplain at the United States Naval Academy in Annapolis, Maryland where he served cadets of all faiths with distinction and received Navy citations for his work.

Awards and Qualifications
Cash's awards include:

References

Obama Administration MSNBC, 10-14-09
Time magazine: The Obamas Find a Church Home — Away from Home
Obama chaplain has Tennessee ties Joe Biddle • The Tennessean • October 4, 2009
'He is excellent' says President Obama

Year of birth missing (living people)
Living people
People from Memphis, Tennessee
The Citadel Bulldogs football players
Southwestern Baptist Theological Seminary alumni
American Christian clergy
United States Navy chaplains
Chaplains of the United States Marine Corps